Colin Adams is the name of:

Colin Adams (executive), British TV executive
Colin Adams (mathematician) (born 1956), American mathematician and author

See also
Adams (surname)